Kidō Senshi Gundam SEED Battle Destiny is a game of the Kidou Senshi Gundam series for the PlayStation Vita. , it has only been released in Japan. The game is a mech sim. The game was developed by Artdink and published by Bandai Namco Games.

Reception
The game sold 40,297 copies during the first sales recording period, placing the game at #3 in the Media Create sales chart for all Japanese video games. This was considered a surprising success for a Vita game.

References

2012 video games
Action video games
Artdink games
Bandai Namco games
Gundam video games
Japan-exclusive video games
Mobile Suit Gundam SEED
Multiplayer and single-player video games
PlayStation Vita games
PlayStation Vita-only games
Video games developed in Japan